The Lesser Franciscans is a fellowship of like-minded Christians who agree annually to follow a common rule and mission. They are not a religious order; they are instead a fellowship of faithful who believe God is calling the world in Christ to a renewal of heart and soul.

See also
 Franciscan

External links
The Lesser Franciscans

Anglican organizations